This is a list of English football transfers for the 2015 summer transfer window. Only moves featuring at least one Premier League or Championship club are listed.

The summer transfer window began once clubs had concluded their final domestic fixture of the 2014–15 season, but many transfers officially went through on 1 July because the majority of player contracts finished on 30 June. The window remained open until 18:00 BST on 1 September 2015. The window shuts at 18:00 BST this time due to the UEFA player registration deadlines for both the Champions League and Europa League ending at 23:00 BST, giving the 6 sides still in Europe time to conclude deals and register their player for continental matches if appropriate.

This list also includes transfers featuring at least one Premier League or Championship club which were completed after the end of the winter 2014–15 transfer window and before the end of the 2015 summer window

Players without a club may join at any time, and clubs below Premier League level may sign players on loan during loan windows. Clubs may be permitted to sign a goalkeeper on an emergency loan if they have no registered goalkeeper available.

Transfers

All clubs without a flag are English. Note that while Cardiff City and Swansea City are affiliated with the Football Association of Wales and thus take the Welsh flag, they play in the English football league system, and so their transfers are included here.

 Player officially joined his club on 1 July 2015.

References

Specific

Transfers Summer 2015
Summer 2015
English